The 1875 Iowa gubernatorial election was held on October 12, 1875. Republican nominee Samuel J. Kirkwood defeated Democratic nominee Shepherd Leffler with 57.03% of the vote.

General election

Candidates
Major party candidates
Samuel J. Kirkwood, Republican
Shepherd Leffler, Democratic 

Other candidates
J. H. Lozier, Prohibition

Results

References

1875
Iowa